Sean Hickey (born September 29, 1991) is a former American football offensive tackle. He played college football at Syracuse.

College career
Hickey started 38 straight games for the Syracuse Orange at left tackle during his college career.

Professional career

New Orleans Saints
Hickey signed with the New Orleans Saints as an undrafted free agent on May 4, 2015. He was waived on September 5, 2015, and was signed to the practice squad the next day, only to be released the following week.

New England Patriots
On October 1, 2015, Hickey was signed to the New England Patriots' practice squad. He was released on October 9, 2015.

New York Jets
On January 19, 2016, Hickey was signed by the New York Jets, but was released on May 6, 2016.

Minnesota Vikings
On July 27, 2016, Hickey was signed by the Minnesota Vikings. He was waived on August 30, 2016, and later re-signed to the practice squad on September 27, 2016. He spent time on and off the Vikings' practice squad before being released on December 3, 2016.

Miami Dolphins
On August 15, 2017, Hickey was signed by the Miami Dolphins. He was waived on September 2, 2017, and was signed to the Dolphins' practice squad the next day. He signed a reserve/future contract with the Dolphins on January 1, 2018. He was waived on May 29, 2018.

Jacksonville Jaguars
On June 14, 2018, Hickey signed with the Jacksonville Jaguars. He was waived/injured on July 23, 2018, and was placed on injured reserve. He was released on August 1, 2018.

St. Louis BattleHawks
Hickey signed with the St. Louis BattleHawks of the XFL during mini-camp in December 2019. He was placed on injured reserve on January 17, 2020. He had his contract terminated when the league suspended operations on April 10, 2020.

References

External links
Syracuse Orange bio
Miami Dolphins bio

1991 births
Living people
American football offensive tackles
Syracuse Orange football players
New Orleans Saints players
New England Patriots players
New York Jets players
People from Westmoreland County, Pennsylvania
Players of American football from Pennsylvania
Sportspeople from the Pittsburgh metropolitan area
Minnesota Vikings players
Miami Dolphins players
Jacksonville Jaguars players
St. Louis BattleHawks players